Pterodontia misella is a species of small-headed flies (insects in the family Acroceridae). It is very close in appearance to Pterodontia flavipes, and was considered a synonym of it by Curtis Williams Sabrosky in 1948. However, this synonymy has not been adopted by later authors, and P. misella is still recognised as a distinct species.

References

Acroceridae
Articles created by Qbugbot
Taxa named by Carl Robert Osten-Sacken
Insects described in 1877